Jonas Bade (born 16 March 1956) is a Papua New Guinean boxer. He competed in the men's light welterweight event at the 1988 Summer Olympics.

References

External links

1956 births
Living people
Light-welterweight boxers
Papua New Guinean male boxers
Olympic boxers of Papua New Guinea
Boxers at the 1988 Summer Olympics
Commonwealth Games competitors for Papua New Guinea
Boxers at the 1990 Commonwealth Games
Place of birth missing (living people)